People of a Feather is a Canadian documentary film, directed by Joel Heath and released in 2011. The film explores the impact of the development of hydroelectric dam projects in the Canadian Arctic on the population of eider ducks at Sanikiluaq, Nunavut.

Awards

The film received a Canadian Screen Award nomination at the 2nd Canadian Screen Awards, for Best Feature Length Documentary.

References

External links
 

2011 films
2011 documentary films
Canadian documentary films
Documentary films about Inuit in Canada
Films shot in Nunavut
2010s Canadian films